The 1945 Oklahoma A&M Cowboys football team represented Oklahoma Agricultural and Mechanical College (later renamed Oklahoma State University–Stillwater) in the Missouri Valley Conference during the 1945 college football season. The team was led by seventh-year head coach Jim Lookabaugh and played its home games at Lewis Field in Stillwater, Oklahoma. The Cowboys compiled a 9–0 record (1–0 against conference opponents), won the Missouri Valley championship, defeated Saint Mary's in the 1946 Sugar Bowl, were ranked No. 5 in the final AP Poll, and outscored all opponents by a combined total of 285 to 76. The 1945 season remains the only undefeated season in school history.

On offense, the 1945 team averaged 31.7 points, 286.9 rushing yards, and 133.5 passing yards per game.  On defense, the team allowed an average of 8.4 points, 108.6 rushing yards and 79.6 passing yards per game.

Halfback Bob Fenimore led the nation with 1,048 rushing yards. He also led the team with 593 passing yards, 72 points scored, and seven interceptions. Fenimore was selected as a consensus first-team halfback on the 1945 All-America college football team. He was later inducted into the College Football Hall of Fame.

Three Oklahoma A&M players received first-team All-Missouri Valley Conference honors in 1945: Bob Fenimore, end Neill Armstrong, and lineman J.C. Colhouer.

In 2016, the American Football Coaches Association (AFCA), the organization responsible for the Coaches Poll, awarded Oklahoma A&M its 1945 national championship. The AFCA created a commission to consider applications for national title consideration for years spanning 1922 to 1949. OSU was (and continues to be) the only school to apply for the honor for any of the 28 years considered. The AFCA committee stated that Army could also be recognized as co-champion for 1945 "if the school decides to submit paperwork to the AFCA for evaluation by the committee." Army was selected as national champion by all 14 selectors that the NCAA considered to be "major", including all 8 contemporary selectors. The undefeated 1945 Army team was one of the strongest of all time, as during World War II, loose player transfer rules allowed service academies to assemble many of the nation's best players.

Schedule

After the season

The 1946 NFL Draft was held on January 14, 1946. The following Cowboys were selected.

References

Oklahoma AandM
Oklahoma State Cowboys football seasons
College football national champions
Missouri Valley Conference football champion seasons
Sugar Bowl champion seasons
College football undefeated seasons
Oklahoma AandM